Sava Vuković (20 January 1912 – 28 July 1961) was a Serbian origin Yugoslav chess master, Yugoslav Chess Championship bronze medalist (1939).

Biography
Sava Vuković participated in several Yugoslav Chess Championships and won bronze medal in 1939. Also he won 
Belgrade Chess Club Championship in 1934.

Sava Vuković played for Yugoslavia in the Chess Olympiad:
 In 1937, at third board in the 7th Chess Olympiad in Stockholm (+1, =0, -7).

Sava Vuković played for Yugoslavia in the Men's Chess Balkaniads:
 In 1946, at seventh board in the 1st Men's Chess Balkaniad in Belgrade (+1, =0, -1) and won team gold and individual silver medals,
 In 1947, at first reserve board in the 2nd Men's Chess Balkaniad in Sofia (+0, =0, -1) and won team silver medal.

References

External links

Sava Vuković chess games at 365chess.com

1912 births
1961 deaths
Serbian chess players
Yugoslav chess players
Chess Olympiad competitors
20th-century chess players